ADLER Futbol Club San Nicolás, commonly known as ADLER were a Salvadoran professional football club based in San Nicolas, Apopa.

They competited in the Primera División de Fútbol Profesional between 1965 and 1972. Currently Defunct.

Notable players
El Salvador:
 Salvador Flamenco Cabezas (1966-1971) . 
 Rafael Bucaro
 David Stokes
 Tomás Gamboa

Notable coaches
Argentina:
 Gregorio Bundio 

El Salvador:
 Rigoberto Guzmán

References

Defunct football clubs in El Salvador
Santa Ana, El Salvador